Spodnja Ročica is a settlement in the Municipality of Benedikt in northeastern Slovenia. It lies in the Slovene Hills. The area is part of the traditional region of Styria and is now included in the Drava Statistical Region.

Fourteen partly destroyed Roman-period burial mounds have been identified near the settlement.

References

External links
Spodnja Ročica at Geopedia

Populated places in the Municipality of Benedikt